Donald Ramsamooj (5 July 1932 – 23 May 1993) was a professional cricketer who spent his career between Trinidad and Northamptonshire.

Career
Ramsamooj started his career and played five first-class games for Trinidad during a five-year spell before moving to England to join Northamptonshire. While at Northampton, he played 71 games and scored his highest first-class score of 132 against Derbyshire in 1963.

References

External links

1932 births
1993 deaths
English cricketers
Northamptonshire cricketers
People from Bedfordshire
Trinidad and Tobago cricketers
A. E. R. Gilligan's XI cricketers
People from San Fernando, Trinidad and Tobago